Rafael Roberto Quintero Díaz (born July 24, 1994) is a Puerto Rican diver. He competed in the men's 10 m platform event at the 2016 Summer Olympics.

References

External links
 

1994 births
Living people
People from Río Grande, Puerto Rico
Puerto Rican male divers
Divers at the 2016 Summer Olympics
Olympic divers of Puerto Rico
Divers at the 2015 Pan American Games
Divers at the 2019 Pan American Games
Pan American Games competitors for Puerto Rico
Divers at the 2020 Summer Olympics
Central American and Caribbean Games bronze medalists for Puerto Rico
Central American and Caribbean Games medalists in diving
Competitors at the 2014 Central American and Caribbean Games
21st-century Puerto Rican people